China Ogirala is a village in Krishna district of the Indian state of Andhra Pradesh. It is located in Vuyyuru mandal of Nuzvid revenue division.

References 

Villages in Krishna district